Xiong Ai (reigned c. 977 BCE) was the second viscount of the state of Chu during the early Zhou Dynasty of ancient China. He succeeded his father Xiong Yi, who was enfeoffed by King Cheng of Zhou and granted the hereditary noble rank of viscount.

Ancient Chinese texts recorded that King Zhao of Zhou, the grandson of King Cheng of Zhou, led an expedition against Chu, but Zhou was defeated and King Zhao himself drowned in the Han River in 977 BCE. It is generally believed that Xiong Ai was the monarch of Chu at the time.

Xiong Ai was succeeded by his son, Xiong Dan.

References

Monarchs of Chu (state)
10th-century BC Chinese monarchs
Year of birth unknown
Year of death unknown